Donna McKevitt (born 1970) is an English composer based in London. She studied viola with Gustav Clarkson and voice with Linda Hirst and gained a BA Hons in music at Kingston Polytechnic.

She was a member of Miranda Sex Garden between 1991 and 1994 recording Iris, Suspiria and Fairytales of Slavery with them for Mute Records and touring Japan, The States and Europe.

She began a collaboration with Greg Roberts of Dreadzone going on to write, sing and play on their albums Second Light and Biological Radio with Virgin Records.

While touring and recording full-time Donna set some of Maya Angelou's poems for voice, trumpet and double bass and in 1993, after contributing to the soundtrack of Derek Jarman's last film Blue, she began work on Translucence. These settings of Jarman's poems were recorded for Warner Classics in 1997 by Andrew Keener and featured the voices of Michael Chance and Melanie Pappenheim. "A work of haunting and unpretentious beauty", 'Translucence' has been performed by the original ensemble at Columbia University (broadcast live on WNYC Radio), at The City of London Festival and at Tate Modern. It has also been performed at The Edinburgh Festival and in Boston, Tokyo, Sydney and Zurich by other ensembles.

In 2000 Donna moved to Sarajevo where she continued writing, producing settings of poetry by Paul Celan, E. E. Cummings, Ben Okri and later, in collaboration with film maker Chris Briggs, work by Pablo Neruda. 'Love Songs for Michael', the settings of three Michaelangelo sonnets for Michael Chance and lutist Nigel North, were commissioned and performed at The Radovljica Festival in Slovenia in 2000.

Donna is a member of the band The Mabuses and composer for the photographer Emma Summerton contributing film scores and soundtracks for the fashion house Bodyamr, London and Paris Fashion Week, Jaeger and Italian Vogue.

2010 saw the release of This is What I Wanted to Give You' a collaboration with The Cesarians' drummer and poet Jan Noble and the beginning of a new song cycle from McKevitt. A live preview of the forthcoming debut album from 'McKevitt & Noble', showcased at the East End Film Festival in May 2011, was McKevitt's first live performance in nearly 10 years.
In 2012 Donna wrote the score for the feature film The Fold directed by John Jencks and in the same year produced a score with composer Hannah Peel for a contemporary dance piece Compass performed on the main stage at Sadler's Wells.

In 2015 she was awarded a place on Yorke Dance's Cohan Collective  and went on to be commissioned to write a piece for a new work with choreographer Charlotte Edmonds which was premiered at The Lilian Baylis Studio.

A one-hour retrospective of her work (broadcast on WNYC in December 2011) included a live studio session with trumpeter Lew Soloff and double bassist Francois Mouton in which she presented her settings of Maya Angelou's poetry as well as recordings of her work with Miranda Sex Garden, songs from Translucence and new tracks from McKevitt & Noble.

In 2018 Donna won first prize to write a new work for Festival Stradella, the resulting work Concentus was performed across Italy, and in 
2019 was commissioned to write for The ORA Singers inaugural concert at LSO St Lukes London.

In 2021, Donna was commissioned by the vocal group Voces8 to write two new pieces for their Live From London concert series. She set a poem by Pablo Neruda - Keeping Quiet and another by Edna St Vincent Millay - Renascence.

In 2020 Donna collaborated with film maker Mark Cousin's and write the score for his film The Story of Looking which was premiered at The Sheffield Festival and Telluride.

She went onto collaborate again with Cousin's on his examination of Alfred Hitchcock's filmography in the film My Name is Alfred Hitchcock which was premiered at The Telluride Film Festival in 2022.

In 2021, Donna was given The Composers'Fund award from PRS Foundation to compose a new work for voices and orchestra.

Her setting of the Nunc dimittis "Lumen" is released this year 2022 by The Gesualdo Six on Hyperion

Discography

 Iris with Miranda Sex Garden, 1992, Mute Records
 Suspiria with Miranda Sex Garden, 1993, Mute Records
 Fairytales of Slavery with Miranda Sex Garden, 1993, Mute Records
 Second Light  with Dreadzone, 1995, Virgin Records
 Earth Angel (single) with Dreadzone, 1997, Virgin Records
 Biological Radio with Dreadzone, 1997, Virgin Records
 Translucence Jarman/McKevitt, 1998, Warner Classics
 Translucence Jarman/McKevitt, 2004, Dharma Records
 This is what I wanted to give you (single) McKevitt & Noble, 2010, Not Your Average Type
 This is a Bucket (single) McKevitt & Noble, 2010, Not Your Average Type
 This is her... (single) McKevitt & Noble, 2011, Not Your Average Type
 Cut EP

External links
[ Donna McKevitt] at Allmusic

References

1970 births
Living people
English composers
Alumni of Kingston University